Billy Joe Shearsby (born 14 September 1972) is an Australian former track cyclist. He won the team pursuit at the 1993 UCI Track Cycling World Championships in Hamar, Norway, alongside Brett Aitken, Stuart O'Grady and Tim O'Shannessey. It was the first gold medal for Australia in this event. In addition, the team also set a new world record, covering the four kilometers in 4:03.840.

External links

1972 births
Living people
Australian male cyclists
UCI Track Cycling World Champions (men)
Australian track cyclists
20th-century Australian people
21st-century Australian people